Col. Josiah Parker Family Cemetery is a historic family cemetery located near Smithfield, Isle of Wight County, Virginia. It is the burial site of American Revolutionary War Colonel, naval officer, and Congressman Josiah Parker (1751-1810).  Its location was rediscovered in 2001.  The family believes a total of 30 persons are buried at the site.

It was listed on the National Register of Historic Places in 2004.

References

Cemeteries on the National Register of Historic Places in Virginia
National Register of Historic Places in Isle of Wight County, Virginia